Karen Chee is an American comedian and writer. She has been a staff writer for Late Night with Seth Meyers since January 2019.

Early life and career
Chee's parents emigrated to the United States from South Korea.

Chee originally wanted to become a speechwriter, but became interested in pursuing professional comedy by the time she enrolled at Harvard College. During college, she was president of The Immediate Gratification Players, an improvisational comedy trope, and founded a sketch comedy show.

Chee interned at Full Frontal with Samantha Bee and The Late Show with Stephen Colbert, where she appeared on air alongside Keegan-Michael Key. She contributed to publications including McSweeney's, Reductress, and The New Yorker. She also wrote for the 2019 Golden Globes for hosts Andy Samberg and Sandra Oh.

In early 2019, Chee joined Late Night with Seth Meyers. She has appeared on air for a recurring segment called What Does Karen Know?, in which Meyers and Chee quiz each other about cultural touchstones which their respective generations take for granted.

Personal life
Chee lives in Brooklyn, New York. In 2020, she temporarily relocated to South Korea to help take care of her grandparents. She continued to write remotely for Late Night.

References

External links

 
 

1995 births
Living people
21st-century American comedians
American comedy writers
American women comedians
American people of South Korean descent
American television writers
Harvard College alumni
Late Night with Seth Meyers
American women television writers
21st-century American non-fiction writers
American women non-fiction writers
Writers from Brooklyn
21st-century American screenwriters
21st-century American women writers